Elections to the Dutch Senate are scheduled for 30 May 2023.

Electoral system 
The Senate consists of 75 members elected every four years by the members of the States-Provincial of the country's twelve provinces, and, following law changes in 2017 and 2022, electoral colleges representing the special municipalities of Bonaire, Sint Eustatius and Saba and representing people with Dutch nationality who are  living outside the Kingdom of the Netherlands, who are in turn elected directly by the citizens two months earlier in the 2023 provincial and electoral college elections. The seats are distributed in one nationwide constituency using party-list proportional representation.

The value of each elector's vote is determined by the population of the province or special municipality which the elector represents, at a ratio of approximately 1 vote per 100 residents.

Seat projections 
As the Senate is elected by representatives chosen in earlier the 2023 provincial and electoral college elections, it is possible to project the Senate election results.

The minority coalition is projected to drop from 32 to 22 seats, requiring even more support from opposition parties for a majority vote. 
 15 supporting votes of just the GL-PvdA opposition will be insufficient. 
 17 seats of BBB will suffice.

References 

Senate elections in the Netherlands
Senate